Emergency Management Ontario is the Office of Emergency Management for the province of Ontario responsible for planning for and responding to and recovering from all man-made or natural disasters within the province. The agency is under the responsibility of the Ministry of the Solicitor General. The agency's mandate is governed by the Emergency Management and Civil Protection Act of 1990. EMO works with City of Toronto Emergency Management Office (OEM), other similar provincial agencies across Canada as well as Public Safety Canada.

Geographical Divisions

With the vastness of the province, EMO is divided into geographical regions or Emergency Management Sector Areas that have 40 to 50 municipalities in their area of coverage:

 Amethyst - covering Northwestern Ontario
 Albany - covering most of Northeastern Ontario
 Bruce - covering the Bruce Peninsula and regions within the Bruce Escarpment outside of the Golden Horseshoe
 Capital - covering areas near Ottawa region
 Golden Horseshoe - covering areas around the Greater Toronto Area and beyond
 Killarney - covering the southern end of Northeastern Ontario
 Lakes - covering areas east of Georgian Bay
 Loyalist - covering most of Eastern Ontario outside of Ottawa region
 Severn - covering the areas east of Golden Horseshoe 
 St. Clair - covering the areas of Southwestern Ontario

Agency Heads

 Dr James Young 2004
 Julian Fantino 2005-2006
 Jay C. Hope 2006-2018
 Mario Di Tommaso 2018–present

References

Canadian links
 Public Safety Canada Emergency preparedness
 Alberta Emergency Management Agency
 Saskatchewan Emergency Management Organization
 Manitoba Emergency Measures Organization
 Emergency Management Ontario
 Ministère de la Sécurité publique du Québec (MSP) (Department of Public Security, Québec)
 New Brunswick Emergency Measures Organization
 Nova Scotia Emergency Measures Organization
 Prince Edward Island Emergency Measures Organization

 Fire and Emergency Services – Newfoundland and Labrador
 Northwest Territories Ministry of Municipal and Community Affairs
 Nunavut Emergency Management
 Yukon Emergency Measures Organization

Emergency management in Canada
Safety organizations
Ontario government departments and agencies
Organizations based in Toronto